"Wanted You" is a song by Canadian rapper Nav featuring American rapper Lil Uzi Vert. It was released on November 3, 2017, as the lead single from Nav's debut studio album Reckless (2018). The song was written alongside Cash, DJ Khaled, and producer Ben Billions.

Composition 
The song is a "mellow trap ballad" featuring keys with "punctuations of drums and shimmering hi-hats". On the track, Nav and Lil Uzi Vert sing about their past failed relationships. In the first verse, Nav expresses disappointment in having a relationship with a girl he met on Instagram, only to find she cares only about the luxurious lifestyle he offers. In the second verse, Lil Uzi sing-raps about being cheated on and having gratitude for what they have.

Charts

Certifications

References 

2017 songs
2017 singles
Nav (rapper) songs
Lil Uzi Vert songs
XO (record label) singles
Republic Records singles
Songs written by Nav (rapper)
Songs written by Lil Uzi Vert
Songs written by Amir Esmailian
Songs written by DJ Khaled
Songs written by Ben Billions
Songs about heartache